The 1898–99 United States collegiate men's ice hockey season was the 5th season of collegiate ice hockey. 

College hockey lost several teams prior to the 1898–99 season, including the first school to field a team (Johns Hopkins University).

Regular season

Standings

References

1898–99 NCAA Standings

External links
College Hockey Historical Archives

 
College